The Society of the Cincinnati is a fraternal, hereditary society founded in 1783 to commemorate the American Revolutionary War that saw the creation of the United States. Membership is largely restricted to descendants of military officers who served in the Continental Army.

The Society has thirteen constituent societies in the United States and one in France. It was founded to perpetuate "the remembrance of this vast event" (the achievement of American Independence), "to preserve inviolate those exalted rights and liberties of human nature," and "to render permanent the cordial affection subsisting among the officers" of the Continental Army who served in the Revolutionary War.

Now in its third century, the Society promotes public interest in the Revolution through its library and museum collections, publications, and other activities. It is the oldest patriotic, hereditary society in America.

History  

The Society is named after Lucius Quinctius Cincinnatus, who left his farm to accept a term as Roman Consul and served as Magister Populi (with temporary powers similar to that of a modern-era dictator). He assumed lawful dictatorial control of Rome to meet a war emergency. When the battle was won, he returned power to the Senate and went back to plowing his fields. The Society's motto reflects that ethic of selfless service: Omnia reliquit servare rempublicam ("He relinquished everything to save the Republic"). The Society has had three goals: "To preserve the rights so dearly won; to promote the continuing union of the states; and to assist members in need, their widows, and their orphans."

The concept of the Society of the Cincinnati was that of Major General Henry Knox. The first meeting of the Society was held in May 1783 at a dinner at the Verplanck House (present-day Mount Gulian), Fishkill, New York, before the British evacuation from New York City. The meeting was presided over by Major General Friedrich Wilhelm von Steuben, with Lieutenant Colonel Alexander Hamilton serving as the orator. The participants agreed to stay in contact with each other after the war. Mount Gulian, von Steuben's headquarters, is considered the birthplace of the Society of the Cincinnati, where the Institution was formally adopted on May 13, 1783.

Membership was generally limited to officers who had served at least three years in the Continental Army or Navy, or had served until the end of the War; it included officers of the French Army and Navy above certain ranks.  Officers in the Continental Line who died during the War were also entitled to be recorded as members, and membership would devolve to their eldest male heir.  Members of the considerably larger fighting forces comprising the Colonial Militias and Minutemen were not entitled to join the Society.  Within 12 months of the founding, a constituent Society had been organized in each of the 13 states and in France. Of about 5,500 men originally eligible for membership, 2,150 had joined within a year. King Louis XVI ordained the French Society of the Cincinnati, which was organized on July 4, 1784 (Independence Day). Up to that time, the King of France had not allowed his officers to wear any foreign decorations, but he made an exception in favor of the badge of the Cincinnati.

The Society's rules adopted a system of primogeniture, wherein membership was passed down to the eldest son after the death of the original member. Present-day hereditary members generally must be descended from an original member, an officer who died in service, or an officer who qualified for membership at the Society's founding but did not join. Each officer may be represented by only one descendant at any given time, following the rules of primogeniture.  (The rules of eligibility and admission are controlled by each of the 14 Constituent Societies to which members are admitted. They differ slightly in each society, and some allow more than one descendant of an eligible officer.)  The requirement for primogeniture made the society controversial in its early years, as the new states quickly did away with laws supporting primogeniture as remnants of the English feudal system.

George Washington was elected the first President General of the Society, serving from December 1783 until his death in 1799. The second President General was Alexander Hamilton, and after he died from wounds suffered in a duel in 1804, he was succeeded by Charles Cotesworth Pinckney.

The society's members have included notable military and political leaders, including 23 of the 39 signers of the United States Constitution.

Insignia  

On June 19, 1783, the General Society of the Cincinnati adopted the bald eagle as its insignia. (The insignia was originally referred to as an "order" in the Society's records.) It is one of America's first post-revolution symbols and an important piece of American iconography. It is the second official American emblem to use the bald eagle, following the Great Seal of the United States. The insignia may have been derived from the same discourse that produced the seal.

The suggestion of the bald eagle as the Cincinnati insignia was made by Major Pierre L'Enfant, a French officer who joined the American Army in 1777, served in the Corps of Engineers, and became one of the first members of the Society. He observed that "[t]he Bald Eagle, which is unique to this continent, and is distinguished from those of other climates by its white head and tail, appears to me to deserve attention." In 1783, L'Enfant was commissioned to travel to France to have the first eagle badges made, based on his design (L'Enfant later planned and partially laid out the city of Washington, D.C.).

The medallions at the center of the Cincinnati Eagle depict, on the obverse, Cincinnatus receiving his sword from Roman senators and, on the reverse, Cincinnatus at his plow being crowned by the figure of Pheme (a personification of fame). The Society's colors, light blue and white, symbolize the fraternal bond between the United States and France.  While all Cincinnati Eagles conform to this general design, there is no single specific design which is official. Over the years, over 50 different variations of the eagle have been produced – in varying degrees of size, quality and number produced.

A unique diamond encrusted "eagle", referred to as the "Diamond Eagle", was gifted to George Washington by Admiral Comte d'Estaing, on behalf the officers of the French Navy. It was received by Washington on May 11, 1784 at the meeting of the General Society in Philadelphia. Upon Washington's death, in 1799, it was given by his heirs to Alexander Hamilton, who succeeded Washington as President of the Society. Upon Hamilton's death it was given to Charles Cotesworth Pinckney, who succeeded Hamilton as the Society's president. It has ever since served as the official insignia of the Society's president and is transferred when a new president takes office. In the late 20th century, a copy of the Diamond Eagle was made, which is worn by the president on occasions other than the Triennial Meeting.

A specially commissioned "eagle" worn by President General George Washington was presented to Marquis de Lafayette in 1824 during his grand tour of the United States. This badge remained in possession of the Lafayette family until sold at auction on December 11, 2007, for 5.3 million USD by Lafayette's great-great granddaughter. Together with what are believed to be the original ribbon and red leather box, the badge was purchased by the Josée and René de Chambrun Foundation for display in Lafayette's bedroom at Chateau La Grange, his former home, thirty miles east of Paris; it may also be displayed at Mount Vernon, Washington's former home in Virginia. This was one of three eagles known to have been owned by Washington, who most often wore the "diamond eagle", a diamond-encrusted badge given him by the French matelots (sailors). That diamond eagle continues to be passed down to each President General of the Society of the Cincinnati as part of his induction into office.

The Cincinnati Eagle is displayed in various places of public importance, including Sawyer Point in Cincinnati (named for the Society), Ohio. A popular public square was built here to house a 15' bronze statue of Cincinnatus flanked by four masts flying the American, state, city, and Society flags. The flag of the Society displays blue and white stripes and a dark blue canton (containing a circle of 14 stars around the Cincinnati Eagle, representing the fourteen subsidiary societies) in the upper corner next to the hoist. Refer to the section below for the city's historical connection to the Cincinnati.

By Federal law, on ceremonial occasions, Society members may wear their eagles on their American military uniforms. In practice, however, this has been rarely done since the early 20th century.

Criticism 

When news of the foundation of the society spread, judge Aedanus Burke published several pamphlets under the pseudonym Cassius where he criticized the society as an attempt at reestablishing a hereditary nobility in the new republic. The pamphlets, entitled An Address to the Freemen of South Carolina (January 1783) and Considerations on the Society or Order of Cincinnati (October 1783) sparked a general debate that included prominent names, including Thomas Jefferson and John Adams. The criticism voiced concern about the apparent creation of an hereditary elite; membership eligibility is inherited through primogeniture, and generally excluded enlisted men and militia officers, unless they were placed under "State Line" or "Continental Line" forces for a substantial time period, and their descendants.

Benjamin Franklin was among the Society's earliest critics.  He was concerned about the creation of a quasi-noble order, and of the Society's use of the eagle in its emblem, as evoking the traditions of heraldry and the English aristocracy. In a letter to his daughter Sarah Bache written on January 26, 1784, Franklin commented on the ramifications of the Cincinnati:

I only wonder that, when the united Wisdom of our Nation had, in the Articles of Confederation, manifested their Dislike of establishing Ranks of Nobility, by Authority either of the Congress or of any particular State, a Number of private persons should think proper to distinguish themselves and their Posterity, from their fellow Citizens, and form an Order of hereditary Knights, in direct Opposition to the solemnly declared Sense of their Country.
The influence of the Cincinnati members, former officers, was another concern. When delegates to the Constitutional Convention were debating the method of choosing a president, James Madison (the secretary of the convention) reported the following speech of Elbridge Gerry of Massachusetts:
A popular election in this case is radically vicious. The ignorance of the people would put it in the power of some one set of men dispersed through the Union & acting in Concert to delude them into any appointment. He observed that such a Society of men existed in the Order of the Cincinnati. They are respectable, United, and influential. They will in fact elect the chief Magistrate in every instance, if the election be referred to the people. [Gerry's] respect for the characters composing this Society could not blind him to the danger & impropriety of throwing such a power into their hands.

The debate spread to France on account of the eligibility of French veterans from the Revolutionary War. In 1785 Honoré Gabriel Riqueti, comte de Mirabeau was approached by Franklin, who was at the time stationed in Paris and suggested to him to write something about the society directed at the French public. Mirabeau was provided with Burke's pamphlets and Franklin's letter to his daughter, and from this, with the help of Nicolas Chamfort, created his own enlarged version entitled Considérations sur l'Ordre de Cincinnatus which was published in London November that year, an English translation carried out by Samuel Romilly followed, of which an American edition was published in 1786.

Following this public debate and criticism, George Washington, who had been unaware of the particulars of the charter when he agreed to become president of the society, began to have doubts about the benefit of the society. He had in fact considered abolishing the society on its very first general meeting May 4, 1784. However, in the meantime Major L'Enfant had arrived bringing his designs of the diplomas and medals, as well as news of the success of the society in France, which made an abolishment of the society impossible. Washington instead at the meeting launched an ultimatum, that if the clauses about heredity were not abandoned, he would resign from his post as president of the society. This was accepted, and furthermore informal agreement was made not to wear the eagles in public, so as not to resemble European chivalrous orders. A new charter, the so-called Institution, was printed, which omitted among others the disputed clauses about heredity. This was sent to the local chapters for approval, and it was approved in all of them except for the chapters in New York, New Hampshire and Delaware. However, when the public furor about the society had died down, the new Institution was rescinded, and the original reintroduced, including the clauses about heredity.
The French chapter, which had obtained official permission to form from the king Louis XVI of France, also abolished heredity, but never reintroduced it, and thus the last members were approved February 3, 1792, shortly before the French monarchy was disbanded.

Later activities

City development by early members 
The members of the Cincinnati were among those developing many of America's first and largest cities to the west of the Appalachians, most notably Cincinnati, Ohio and Pittsburgh, Pennsylvania.

The first governor of the Northwest Territory, Arthur St. Clair, was a member of the Society. He renamed a small settlement "Cincinnati" to honor the Society and to encourage settlement by Society members. Among them were Captain Jacob Piatt, who settled across the river from Cincinnati in northern Kentucky on land granted to him for his service during the War. Captain David Ziegler was the first Mayor of Cincinnati.

Lt. Ebenezer Denny (1761–1822), an original Pennsylvanian Cincinnatus, was elected the first mayor of the incorporated city of Pittsburgh in 1816. Pittsburgh developed from Fort Pitt, which had been commanded since 1777–1783 by four men who were founding members of the Society.

Richard Varick was a Mayor of New York City.

Public awareness 
Today's Society supports efforts to increase public awareness and memory of the ideals and actions of the men who created the American Revolution and an understanding of American history, with an emphasis on the period from the outset of the Revolution to the War of 1812. At its headquarters at Anderson House in Washington, DC, the Society holds manuscript, portrait, and model collections pertaining to events of and military science during this period. Members of the Society have contributed to endow professorships, lecture series, awards, and educational materials in relation to the United States' representative democracy.

Membership rules 
Over the years, membership rules have continued as first established. The definition and acceptance of membership has remained with the constituent societies rather than with the General Society in Washington. An eligible officer of the Continental Army during the Revolutionary War can be represented in the Society of the Cincinnati by only one male descendant at a time, successor members excepted. Collateral male heirs are accepted in some constituent societies if the direct male line dies out.

Each of the fourteen constituent societies admits honorary male members, but these men cannot designate an heir (referred to as a successor member). The only U.S. President who was a true hereditary member was Franklin Pierce. Andrew Jackson and Zachary Taylor were honorary members before becoming president. Other presidents became honorary members while in office, and after leaving office.

The Society of the Cincinnati Prize 
The Society of the Cincinnati Prize recognizes the author of an outstanding work that advances understanding of the American Revolution and its legacy. Established in 1989 as a triennial award, the prize is now presented annually.

Since 1989, the authors awarded this prize are:
1989 – Bernard Bailyn, Voyagers to the West: A Passage in the Peopling of America on the Eve of the Revolution
1992 – P. D. G. Thomas, Tea Party to Independence: The Third Phase of the American Revolution
1995 – Stanley M. Elkins and Eric L. McKitrick, The Age of Federalism
1998 – Jack N. Rakove, Original Meanings: Politics and Ideas in the Making of the Constitution
2001 – Saul Cornell, The Other Founders: Anti-Federalism and the Dissenting Tradition in America
2004 – Elizabeth Fenn, Pox Americana: The Great Smallpox Epidemic of 1775–1782
2007 – Alan Taylor, The Divided Ground: Indians, Settlers, and the Northern Borderland of the American Revolution
2010 – Matthew H. Spring, With Zeal and With Bayonets Only: The British Army on Campaign in North America, 1775–1783
2013 – Benjamin L. Carp, Defiance of the Patriots: The Boston Tea Party and the Making of America
2018 – Eric Hinderaker, Boston's Massacre

Headquarters 

The General Society is headquartered at Anderson House, also known as the Larz Anderson House, at 2118 Massachusetts Avenue, NW in the Dupont Circle neighborhood of Washington, D.C. The Anderson House also serves as a Society museum and research library. It is located on Embassy Row, near various international embassies.

Anderson House was built between 1902 and 1905 as the winter residence of Larz Anderson, an American diplomat, and his wife, Isabel Weld Perkins, an author and American Red Cross volunteer.  The architects Arthur Little and Herbert Browne of Boston designed Anderson House in the Beaux-Arts style.  Anderson House was listed on the National Register of Historic Places in 1971 and was further designated a National Historic Landmark in 1996.

The General Society's museum collections include portraits, armaments, and personal artifacts of Revolutionary War soldiers; commemorative objects; objects associated with the history of the Society and its members, including Cincinnati china and insignia; portraits and personal artifacts of members of the Anderson family; and artifacts related to the history of the house, including the U.S. Navy's occupation of it during World War II.

Library 
The library of the General Society of the Cincinnati collects, preserves, and makes available for research printed and manuscript materials relating to the military and naval history of the eighteenth century and early nineteenth century, with a particular concentration on the people and events of the American Revolution and the War of 1812.  The collection includes a variety of modern and rare materials including official military documents, contemporary accounts and discourses, manuscripts, maps, graphic arts, literature, and many works on naval art and science.  In addition, the library is the home to the archives of the Society of the Cincinnati as well as a collection of material relating to Larz and Isabel Anderson.  The library is open to researchers by appointment.

American Revolution Institute 
The Society of the Cincinnati created the American Revolution Institute (ARI) in 2012 to renew appreciation of the history and ideals of our revolutionary generation. ARI is an advocacy organization dedicated to promoting understanding and appreciation of the American Revolution and its legacy.

Affiliations 
American Independence Museum: The Society of the Cincinnati in the State of New Hampshire owns and operates through a board of governors the American Independence Museum in Exeter, New Hampshire.  The American Independence Museum is a private, not-for-profit institution whose mission is to provide a place for the study, research, education and interpretation of the American Revolution and of the role that New Hampshire, Exeter, and the Gilman family played in the founding of the new republic. Museum collections include two rare drafts of the U.S. Constitution, an original Dunlap Broadside of the United States Declaration of Independence, as well as an original Badge of Military Merit, awarded by George Washington to soldiers demonstrating extraordinary bravery.  Exhibits highlight the Society of the Cincinnati, the nation's oldest veterans' society, and its first president, George Washington.  Permanent collections include American furnishings, ceramics, silver, textiles and military ephemera.

American Philosophical Society: many Cincinnati were among its first board members and contributors; the modern societies maintain informal, collegial relationships only

Notable original members 

A list of notables from among the original members of the Society of the Cincinnati:

General George Washington – President of the United States and President General of the Society.
Brigadier General and Speaker of the Virginia State Senate Richard Kennon
Louis XVI – King of France
Lieutenant General the Comte de Rochambeau
Chaplain and United States Senator Abraham Baldwin
Chaplain and Minister to France Joel Barlow
Captain Joshua Barney, United States Navy (USN)
Commodore John Barry, USN
Colonel William Barton
Captain and U.S. Representative Thomas Boude
Colonel and Delegate to the U.S. Constitutional Convention David Brearly
Surgeon's Mate Isaac Bronson
Lieutenant and U.S. Representative David Brooks
Major General and Governor John Brooks
Brigadier General Henry Burbeck
Lieutenant Colonel, Senator and Vice President Aaron Burr
Captain David Bushnell – builder of the submarine Turtle
Major General Richard Butler
Lieutenant Colonel and Congressman Edward Carrington 
Brigadier General, Governor and Vice President George Clinton
Brevet Major General James Clinton
Captain Richard Dale, USN
Captain Luke Day
Major General and Secretary of War Henry Dearborn
Captain Ebenezer Denny
Lieutenant Colonel John Doughty
Surgeon and Secretary of War William Eustis
Colonel Christian Febiger
Major Nicholas Fish
Brigadier General Peter Gansevoort
Major General Horatio Gates
Captain Nicholas Gilman
Colonel William Grayson
Major General Nathanael Greene
Major General Alexander Hamilton (President General)
Brevet Brigadier General Josiah Harmar
Major General Robert Howe
Brigadier General Isaac Huger
Major David Humphreys
Colonel Thomas Hunt
Major General Henry Jackson
Brevet Brigadier General Michael Jackson
Major William Jackson
Captain John Paul Jones, USN
Captain William Jones, USMC
Brigadier General Tadeusz Kościuszko
Major General Henry Knox (Secretary General)
Major General the Marquis de La Fayette
Major General Henry Lee III ("Light Horse Harry")
Major Pierre L'Enfant
Major General and Governor Morgan Lewis (President General)
Major General Benjamin Lincoln
Captain James Lingan
Supreme Court Justice Henry Brockholst Livingston
Brevet Brigadier General and Governor George Mathews
Major and US Marshal Allen McLane
Surgeon Charles McKnight
Brigadier General Lachlan McIntosh
Lieutenant Colonel James Monroe, President of the United States
Major, Secretary of State of Georgia John Milton (Georgia politician)
Brigadier General Daniel Morgan
Captain Alexander Murray, USN
Major Samuel Nicholas, USMC
Captain John Nicholson, USN
Captain Samuel Nicholson, USN
Brigadier General and Senator William North
Major, Governor and Senator Aaron Ogden (President General)
Brigadier General Andrew Pickens
Major General Charles C. Pinckney (President General)
Major General Thomas Pinckney (President General)
Brigadier General and Governor Benjamin Pierce
Major General, Senator and Governor Thomas Posey
Brigadier General Rufus Putnam
Lieutenant Colonel Nathaniel Ramsey
Brevet Major Winthrop Sargent
Major General and Senator Philip Schuyler
Major General and Governor Charles Scott
Major General and Congressman William Shepard
Colonel Henry Sherburne
Major General William Smallwood
Lieutenant Colonel William Stephens Smith
Major General Arthur St. Clair
Lieutenant Colonel William Stacy
Major General John Sullivan
Paymaster General Caleb Swan
Colonel Heman Swift
Captain Silas Talbot, USN
Brevet Lieutenant Colonel and Congressman Benjamin Tallmadge
Lieutenant Colonel Richard Taylor
Lieutenant Colonel Tench Tilghman
Lieutenant Colonel and Governor Jonathan Trumbull Jr.
Brigadier General and Congressman Philip Van Cortlandt
Brigadier General James Mitchell Varnum
Colonel Axel von Fersen the Younger (French Army)
Lieutenant Colonel Curt von Stedingk (French Army)
Major General Baron Von Steuben
Colonel and Mayor Richard Varick
Major General Anthony Wayne
Captain Abraham Whipple, USN
Brigadier General Otho Holland Williams
Major David Ziegler
Major General William Heath
Brigadier General William Hull
Brigade Chaplain John Gano

Notable hereditary membersThomas, pp. 17-185.

Military and naval officers 

General Peyton C. March - U.S. Army Chief of Staff.
General John K. Waters – Career Army officer.
Admiral Hilary P. Jones – Commander of the United States Battle Fleet.
Admiral John S. McCain Sr. – Admiral during World War II and grandfather of former U.S. Senator John McCain.
Admiral John S. McCain Jr. – Commander of United States Pacific Command during the Vietnam War, and father of U.S. Senator John McCain. The two McCains are the only father-and-son four-star admirals in U.S. Navy history.
Admiral Thomas Washington - Commander of Atlantic Fleet during World War I.
Admiral Cameron McRae Winslow – Admiral during World War I.
Lieutenant General Ridgely Gaither – Career Army officer.
Lieutenant General, Governor and Senator Wade Hampton III
Lieutenant General John C.H. Lee – Commander of the Services of Supply in the European Theater.
Lieutenant General Edward H. Brooks – World War II Corps Commander and World War I recipient of Distinguished Service Cross.
Major General Lytle Brown – Chief Engineer of the U.S. Army.
Major General Silas Casey – Civil War general.
Major General Thomas L. Crittenden – Civil War general.
Major General Henry A. S. Dearborn – President General of the Society and congressman.
Major General William B. Franklin – Veteran of the Mexican War and the Civil War.
Major General Edgar Erskine Hume – President General of the Society.
Major General Charles Evans Kilbourne II - Medal of Honor recipient.
Major General Edwin Vose Sumner Jr. – Civil War and Spanish–American War veteran.
Rear Admiral Conway Hillyer Arnold - Spanish-American War veteran.
Rear Admiral Charles Henry Davis – Mexican and Civil War veteran.
Rear Admiral Henry Thatcher – Grandson of Major General Henry Knox and Civil War veteran.
Rear Admiral Nathan Crook Twining
Brevet Major General Nicholas Longworth Anderson
Brevet Major General Henry Jackson Hunt – Union general in the Civil War.
Brigadier General William Bancroft – Mayor of Cambridge, Massachusetts and general during the Spanish–American War.
Brigadier General Theodore A. Bingham - Police commissioner of New York City.
Brigadier General Thomas Lincoln Casey – Army engineer who oversaw completion of the Washington Monument.
Brigadier General Thomas L. Crittenden – Civil War general.
Brigadier General and President Franklin Pierce (Only president of the United States to be a hereditary member.)
Brigadier General Cornelius Vanderbilt III – World War I veteran.
Brevet Brigadier General Hazard Stevens – Medal of Honor recipient.
Captain Alfred Brooks Fry, USNR – Marine engineer.
Lieutenant Colonel Frederick Lippitt – Philanthropist.
Lieutenant Colonel Benjamin Kendrick Pierce – Elder brother of President Franklin Pierce and veteran of the War of 1812, Seminole War and the Mexican War.
Major Archibald Butt – Presidential military aide who died on the Titanic.
Major Asa Bird Gardiner – Secretary General of the Society.
Major Cornelius Vanderbilt IV – Newspaper editor.

Government officials 

President Franklin Pierce
Rt. Hon. Sir Winston Churchill KG, CH, FRS – Hereditary member of the Connecticut society; his great-grandson, Duncan Sandys, is currently a hereditary member of the Massachusetts Society.
Secretary of State, Senator and Governor Hamilton Fish – Long-time President General of the Society.
Secretary of War Newton D. Baker 
Supreme Court Justice Oliver Wendell Holmes Jr.
Supreme Court Justice Stanley Forman Reed
Under Secretary of State Frank Polk
Governor and United States Senator William H. Bulkeley – Governor of Connecticut and president of Aetna Insurance Company.
Governor Horatio Seymour – Governor of New York.
Governor DeWitt Clinton – Governor of New York, U.S. Senator and Mayor of New York City.
Governor Robert Fiske Bradford – Governor of Massachusetts
Governor Elisha Dyer Jr. – Governor of Rhode Island.
Governor Wade Hampton III – Governor of South Carolina. 
Governor William W. Hoppin – Governor of Rhode Island.
Governor Charles Warren Lippitt – Governor of Rhode Island.
Governor Robert Milligan McLane – Governor of Maryland and ambassador to France.
Governor LeBaron Bradford Prince – Governor of New Mexico Territory.
Governor Thomas Stockton – Governor of Delaware.
Governor and Senator George Peabody Wetmore
Ambassador Larz Anderson – Socialite and diplomat.
Ambassador Robert W. Bingham
Minister Nicholas Fish II – Minister to Belgium.
Senator Warren R. Austin
Senator James Watson – United States Senator from New York; a founder (1805) and the first president of the New England Society of New York.
Senator Chauncey Depew – Founder of the Pilgrims Society.
Senator Theodore Francis Green – United States Senator from Rhode Island.
Senator Charles Mathias – United States Senator from Maryland.
Senator Claiborne Pell – Long serving Senator from Rhode Island.
Senator Hugh Doggett Scott Jr. – Congressman and United States senator from Pennsylvania.
Senator Charles Sumner – Abolitionist senator from Massachusetts.
Congressman Perry Belmont
Congressman Horace Binney
Congressman Hamilton Fish II
Congressman Hamilton Fish III – College Football Hall of Fame inductee.
Congressman Foster Stearns
Chief Justice of the South Carolina Supreme Court Milledge Lipscomb Bonham
Mayor Carter Harrison Jr. – Mayor of Chicago
United States Attorney George Read III

Others 

Captain Waldron Phoenix Belknap Jr. – art historian, architect, and soldier
Henry L. P. Beckwith – Heraldist, historian and genealogist. Living and self-listed.
Major John Vernou Bouvier III – Stockbroker and socialite.
John Nicholas Brown I – Book collector and philanthropist.
The Honorable John Nicholas Brown – Philanthropist.
Joseph Cotten – Actor
Benjamin Apthorp Gould – Astronomer.
Reverend Alexander Hamilton – great-grandson of Alexander Hamilton
Commodore Arthur Curtiss James – Investor and yachtsman.
Lewis Cass Ledyard – Lawyer and socialite.
Lieutenant Colonel Frederick Lippitt – Philanthropist.
Alfred Lee Loomis – Scientist and inventor.
Louis Alphonse, Duke of Anjou – Claimant to the French throne.  (Representing King Louis XVI.)
The Right Reverend James DeWolf Perry – Presiding bishop of the Episcopal Church.
The Right Reverend William Stevens Perry – Episcopal bishop of Iowa.
Sylvanus Albert Reed – Aeronautical engineer.
Alexander H. Rice Jr. – Geographer.
Roderick Terry - Clergyman and philanthropist.
Alexander S. Webb – Banker.

Notable honorary members 
Since its inception, the Society of the Cincinnati has allowed for honorary members to be admitted who have distinguished themselves in military or public service.

Presidents of the United States 

Andrew Jackson
Zachary Taylor
James Buchanan
Ulysses S. Grant
Grover Cleveland
Benjamin Harrison
William McKinley
Theodore Roosevelt
William Howard Taft
Woodrow Wilson
Warren Harding
Franklin D. Roosevelt
Harry S Truman
Ronald Reagan
George H. W. Bush

Note – Every president who served in the eras of 1885 to 1923 (38 years), 1933 to 1953 (20 years) and 1981 to 1993 (12 years) was an honorary member of the Society.  Presidents George Washington and James Monroe were original members of the Society and President Franklin Pierce was an hereditary member. Zachary Taylor was admitted as an honorary member of the New York Society in 1847, and could have been a hereditary member of the Virginia Society by right of his father, Lieutenant Colonel Richard Taylor (d. 1826), had it been active at the time of his father's death.

Nobel Peace Prize recipients 
Theodore Roosevelt (1906)
Elihu Root (1912)
Woodrow Wilson (1919)
Cordell Hull (1945)
George Marshall (1953)

(Nobel Prize for Literature recipient Winston Churchill was a hereditary member of the Society.)

Naval officers 

Admiral of the Navy George Dewey
Fleet Admiral William D. Leahy
Fleet Admiral Ernest J. King
Fleet Admiral Chester W. Nimitz
Fleet Admiral William Halsey
Admiral David G. Farragut
Admiral David Dixon Porter
Admiral William S. Sims
Admiral Arleigh Burke
Admiral James L. Holloway III
Rear Admiral Caspar F. Goodrich
Rear Admiral Samuel E. Morison
Rear Admiral Alan Shepard
Rear Admiral Charles Stewart
Commodore William Bainbridge
Commodore Stephen Decatur
Commodore Isaac Hull
Commodore Thomas Macdonough
Commodore Matthew C. Perry
Commodore Oliver Hazard Perry
Captain Jesse Elliott
Captain Thomas Truxton
Captain Lewis Warrington

Marine Corps officers 

General Thomas Holcomb
Major General John A. Lejeune
General Lemuel C. Shepherd Jr.

Army officers 

General of the Armies John J. Pershing
General of the Army George C. Marshall
General of the Army Douglas MacArthur
General of the Army Omar Bradley
General William T. Sherman
General Philip H. Sheridan
General Mark Clark
General Lucius D. Clay
General Matthew B. Ridgway
General Norman Schwarzkopf
General William Westmoreland
General John W. Nicholson Jr.
Lieutenant General John M. Schofield
Lieutenant General Nelson A. Miles
Lieutenant General Wade Hampton III, CSA
Brevet Lieutenant General Winfield Scott
Major General Jacob Brown
Major General Frank O. Hunter
Major General George G. Meade
Major General Lewis Morris
Major General John E. Wool
Major General Winfield Scott Hancock
Major General Oliver O. Howard
Major General Hugh L. Scott
Major General Leonard Wood
Brevet Major General Robert Anderson
Brevet Major General George Cadwalader
Brevet Major General Galusha Pennypacker
Brevet Major General Nathan Towson
Brevet Major General Alexander S. Webb
Brevet Major General William Jenkins Worth
Brigadier General and Sears Roebuck Chairman Robert E. Wood
Brigadier General John W. Nicholson
Brevet Brigadier General, Ambassador to France and Medal of Honor Recipient Horace Porter
Colonel Samuel Miles

Government officials 

Secretary of the Navy Charles Francis Adams III
Secretary of War Newton D. Baker
Secretary of State James F. Byrnes
Postmaster General Benjamin Franklin
Secretary of the Army Gordon Gray
Secretary of State Cordell Hull
Secretary of State and Senator Elihu Root
Secretary of State and Senator Daniel Webster
Attorney General Elliot L. Richardson
Supreme Court Justice Owen Roberts
Governor William Paca
Governor Colgate Darden
Governor John Franklin Fort
Governor Charles Dean Kimball
Governor Everett Lake
Governor Jonathan Trumbull
Senator Charles Carroll of Carrollton
Senator Frederick Theodore Frelinghuysen
Senator Henry A. du Pont
Senator Walter F. George
Senator Rufus King
Senator Henry Cabot Lodge Jr.
Senator Gouverneur Morris
Senator Leverett Saltonstall
Senator William Paine Sheffield Sr.
Congressman Butler Ames
Congressman Charles S. Dewey
Congressman William Paine Sheffield Jr.
Delegate William Floyd
Ambassador Amory Houghton
Ambassador Weston Adams (diplomat)
Ambassador Francis L. Kellogg
Ambassador J. William Middendorf
Lieutenant Governor Stephen Van Rensselaer
Lieutenant Governor Pierre Van Cortlandt
Chancellor Robert R. Livingston
Justice James T. Mitchell
Judge Hardy Cross Dillard
Judge Charles G. Garrison
Mayor Louis R. Cheney
FBI Director J. Edgar Hoover
Commissary General John Barker Church.

Civilians 

Yale University President James Rowland Angell
Columbia University President Nicholas M. Butler
Industrialist Pierre S. du Pont
Yale President Timothy Dwight V
Professor John B. Hattendorf
Harvard University President A. Lawrence Lowell
Architect George Champlin Mason Sr.
Historian William H. Prescott
Philanthropist John D. Rockefeller Jr.
Yale President Charles Seymour
Banker and Socialite William Watts Sherman
Yale President Ezra Stiles
Sculptor William Greene Turner
Surgeon John Collins Warren
Lawyer Charles C. Glover III

Foreigners 

King of the Belgians Albert I
Marshal of France Ferdinand Foch
King Gustaf VI Adolf of Sweden
President of France Emile Loubet
Marshal of France Robert Nivelle
Marshal of France Henri-Philippe Petain
Marshal of Sweden Axel von Fersen

See also 
 Military Order of Foreign Wars
 Military Order of the Loyal Legion of the United States
 Order of the Founders and Patriots of America
 Sons of the American Revolution
 Sons of the Revolution
 Daughters of the Cincinnati

Notes

Bibliography 
 Buck, William Bowen. The Society of the Cincinnati in the State of New Jersey. The John L. Murphy Publishing Company, Printers for the Society of the Cincinnati in the State of New Jersey, 1898.
 
 * Davis, Curtis Carroll. Revolution's Godchild: The Birth, Death, and Regeneration of the Society of the Cincinnati in North Carolina. The University of North Carolina Press for the North Carolina Society of the Cincinnati, 1976.
 
 Hill, Steven. The Delaware Cincinnati:  1783-1988.  Dorrance & Company, Inc. for the Delaware Cincinnati Charitable Trust, 1988.
 Hoey, Edwin. "A New and Strange Order of Men," American Heritage. (v. 19, issue 5) August 1968.
 Hume, Edgar Erskine. General Washington's Correspondence Concerning The Society of the Cincinnati. Baltimore: The Johns Hopkins Press, 1941.
 Hünemörder, Markus. The Society of the Cincinnati: Conspiracy and Distrust in Early America. Berghahn Books, 2006.
 Lossing, Benson John Pictorial Fieldbook of the Revolution. Volume I. 1850.
 Metcalf, Bryce. Original Members and Other Officers Eligible to the Society of the Cincinnati. Shenandoah Publishing House, Inc., 1938.
 Myers, Minor. Liberty Without Anarchy: A History of the Society of the Cincinnati. University of Virginia Press, 1983.
 Olson, Lester C. Benjamin Franklin's Vision of American Community: A Study in Rhetorical Iconology.  University of South Carolina Press, 2004.
 
 Warren, Winslow. The Society of the Cincinnati: A History of the General Society of the Cincinnati with the Institution of the Order, Massachusetts Society of the Cincinnati, 1929.
 Thomas, William Sturgis, Members of the Society of the Cincinnati, Original, Hereditary and Honorary; With a Brief Account of the Society's History and Aims New York: T.A. Wright, 1929.

External links 

 
 American Revolution Institute
 American Independence Museum
 Mount Gulian Historic Site
 Society of the Cincinnati Politician members at The Political Graveyard

1783 establishments in New York (state)
501(c)(3) organizations
American Revolution veterans and lineage organizations
Libraries in Washington, D.C.
Non-profit organizations based in Washington, D.C.
Organizations established in 1783
Patriotic societies